CLEFIA is a proprietary block cipher algorithm, developed by Sony. Its name is derived from the French word clef, meaning "key". The block size is 128 bits and the key size can be 128 bit, 192 bit or 256 bit. It is intended to be used in DRM systems.  It is among the cryptographic techniques recommended candidate for Japanese government use by CRYPTREC revision in 2013.

Standardization 
CLEFIA is included in the following standards.

 ISO/IEC 29192-2:2019, Information security - Lightweight cryptography - Part 2: Block ciphers

References

Further reading

External links
 CLEFIA website
 256bit Ciphers - CLEFIA Reference implementation and derived code
 Sony Introduces CLEFIA
 Implementation of 128-bit CLEFIA codec and hash function

Block ciphers
Digital rights management systems